Haim Maor (born 1951) is an Israeli painter and academic.

Early life
Haim Maor was born in Jaffa, Israel in 1951. His parents are Holocaust survivors of Polish Jewish descent.

Career
Maor is a painter. His artwork focuses on representations of the Holocaust. His work has been exhibited at the Auschwitz Jewish Center. He was the recipient of The Minister of Science and Art Prize in 1994, the Sussman Prize from Yad Vashem in 1995, and The Ministry of Culture and Sport Prize in 2010.

Maor is also an Arts professor at the Ben-Gurion University of the Negev in Beersheba, Israel.

References

1951 births
Living people
Israeli people of Polish-Jewish descent
Israeli painters
Academic staff of Ben-Gurion University of the Negev